Clere is a surname. Notable people with the surname include:

Alice Clere (died 1538), daughter of Sir William Boleyn
Edward Clere (born 1974), American politician
John Clere (disambiguation), multiple people
Thomas Clere (died 1545), courtier and poet at the court of Henry VIII

See also
Clear (disambiguation)
Cleare, a surname
Cleere, a surname